Corynomalus elegans is a species of handsome fungus beetles in the subfamily Lycoperdininae. It is found in Ecuador.

References

External links 

 
 Corynomalus elegans at insectoid.info

Beetles described in 1902
Endomychidae
Fauna of Ecuador
Taxa named by Ernő Csíki